The Anuradhapura massacre occurred in Sri Lanka in 1985 and was carried out by the Liberation Tigers of Tamil Eelam. This was the largest massacre of Sinhalese civilians by the LTTE to date; it was also the first major operation carried out by the LTTE outside a Tamil majority area. Initially, EROS claimed responsibility for the massacre, but it later retracted the statement, and joined the PLOTE in denouncing the incident. The groups later accused the LTTE for the attack. Since then, no Tamil militant group has admitted to committing the massacre. However, state intelligence discovered that the operation was ordered by the LTTE's leader Velupillai Prabhakaran. He assigned the massacre to the LTTE Mannar commander Victor (real name Marcelin Fuselus) and it was executed by Victor's subordinate Anthony Kaththiar (alias Radha). The attack was allegedly sparked by the 1985 Valvettiturai massacre, where the Sri Lanka Army massacred 70 Tamil civilians in Prabhakaran's hometown.

Incident
The LTTE hijacked a bus on May 14, 1985, and entered Anuradhapura. As the cadres entered the main bus station, they opened fire indiscriminately with automatic weapons killing and wounding many civilians who were waiting for buses. The cadres then drove to the Sri Maha Bodhi shrine and gunned down nuns, monks and civilians as they were worshipping inside the Buddhist shrine. Before they withdrew, the attacker's strike force entered the national park of Wilpattu and killed 18 Sinhalese in the forest reserve. The attackers had massacred 146 Sinhalese men, women and children in total, in Anuradhapura.

According to HRW,
Initially, a small militant organization, the Eelam Revolutionary Organization of Students (EROS) claimed responsibility for the massacre, but it later retracted the statement, and joined the People's Liberation Organization for Tamil Eelam (PLOTE) in denouncing the incident. The groups accused the LTTE.”

Retaliation
An angered army corporal opened fire on nine Tamil civilians who went to an army camp to seek refuge. He was killed by his commanding officer. Several Tamil shops were attacked in Anuradhapura and Colombo. At least two Tamils bodies were on the street in the former city. On the two days following the attack, 75 Tamil civilians were killed by the Sri Lankan Army in retaliation, including at the Kumudini boat massacre.

References

References and further reading 
 Gunaratna, Rohan. (1998). Sri Lanka's Ethnic Crisis and National Security, Colombo: South Asian Network on Conflict Research. 
 Gunaratna, Rohan. (October 1, 1987). War and Peace in Sri Lanka: With a Post-Accord Report From Jaffna, Sri Lanka: Institute of Fundamental Studies. 
 Gunasekara, S.L. (November 4, 2003). The Wages of Sin, 
 Sri Lanka Tamil Terror Time May 27, 1985

1985 crimes in Sri Lanka
Attacks on civilians attributed to the Liberation Tigers of Tamil Eelam
Massacres in Sri Lanka
Liberation Tigers of Tamil Eelam attacks in Eelam War I
Massacres in 1985
Mass murder of Sinhalese
Terrorist incidents in Sri Lanka in 1985